Paradise is a small ghost town located in Cochise County in the U.S. state of Arizona. The town was settled in 1901 in what was then the Arizona Territory.

History

In 1901 the Chiricahua Development Company located a vein of ore here. A post office was established on October 23, 1901, and at its peak, the town had saloons, general stores, a jail and a hotel. The town was essentially abandoned when the local mines failed, and the post office closed on September 30, 1943. However, a few residents remained. In June 2011, there were five permanent residents and 29 standing structures when the Horseshoe 2 Fire swept through the area. A few homes and cemetery remain.

Geography
Paradise is located 5.7 miles west (up-mountain) from Portal, Arizona, and is surrounded by Coronado National Forest land.

In media 
The ghost-town of Paradise is also notably featured in media, such as video games and motion pictures.

 Postal (1997)
 Postal 2 (2003)
 Postal 2: Apocalypse Weekend (2005)
 Postal Babes (2009)
 Postal 2: Paradise Lost (2015)
 A Long Ride From Hell (1968 - Motion Picture)

See also

 American Old West
 History of Arizona
 List of ghost towns in Arizona

References

Further reading
 Alden Hayes, A Portal to Paradise, University of Arizona Press (1999),

External links
 
 

Former populated places in Cochise County, Arizona
Ghost towns in Arizona
Cemeteries in Arizona